Sachin H. Jain (born 1980) is an American physician who held leadership positions in the Center for Medicare and Medicaid Services (CMS) and the Office of the National Coordinator for Health Information Technology (ONC).  From 2015 to 2020, he served as president and chief executive officer of the CareMore Health System.  In June 2020, it was announced that he would join the SCAN Group and Health Plan as its new President and CEO. He is also adjunct professor of medicine at the Stanford University School of Medicine and a Contributor at Forbes. In 2018, he was named one of American healthcare's most 100 most influential leaders by Modern Healthcare magazine (#36).

Early life and education 

Born in New York City and raised in Alpine, New Jersey, Jain attended high school at the Academy for the Advancement of Science and Technology (now part of the Bergen Academies) where he founded the debate team and the Bergen County Leaders Forum and served internships at Memorial Sloan-Kettering Cancer Center; the Office of the Bergen County Executive; and the Bergen County Department of Health Services.  He was also a Governor's Scholar on Public Issues and the Future of New Jersey. Jain received his undergraduate degree with high honors in government from Harvard College; his medical degree (MD) from Harvard Medical School; and his master's degree in business administration (MBA) from Harvard Business School.  At Harvard College, he was mentored by health care quality guru Donald Berwick and studied under Christopher Winship, Robert Putnam, Deborah Stone, and William Julius Wilson.   At Harvard Medical School, he was president of his class and awarded the Henry Asbury Christian Award for research excellence.  He and classmate Kiran Kakarala were advised by health policy department chair Barbara McNeil and received hundreds of thousands of dollars in grant support from the Commonwealth Fund to build ImproveHealthCare, an initiative to drive incorporation of healthcare policy into medical school curricula that scaled to 17 US medical schools.

Early work 
Jain completed his residency in internal medicine at Brigham and Women's Hospital and Harvard Medical School, but had been granted a two-year leave mid-residency to pursue government service.  He is a founder of several nonprofit health care ventures including the Homeless Health Clinic at UniLu,  the Harvard Bone Marrow Initiative, and the South Asian Healthcare Leadership Forum. He worked with DaVita-Bridge of Life to bring charity dialysis care to rural Rajasthan, India and Medical Missions for Children to bring cleft lip and palate surgery to the region through partnership with the International Human Benefit Services Trust.

While in residency, he was a researcher for Harvard Business School's Institute for Strategy and Competitiveness and worked with professors Michael Porter and Jim Yong Kim to build the emerging field of health care delivery science.  He served as an expert consultant to the World Health Organization.  He later partnered with the University of Pennsylvania's Amol Navathe and the publisher Elsevier to launch the field's charter journal, Healthcare: the Journal of Delivery Science and Innovation.   He also collaborated with Brigham and Women's Hospital and Harvard Business School to create the John McArthur Program for Medicine Leadership.

Early in his career Jain served internships at McKinsey & Company and the Alpha Center for Health Policy. He was also appointed a lecturer in health policy at Harvard Medical School from 2012 to 2015. He has served as guest faculty at the MIT Sloan School of Management, the University of Minnesota, the University of Virginia's Darden School, University of California San Francisco School of Medicine, Stanford University School of Medicine, and the University of Southern California.

Government service 
In 2009, Jain joined the Office of the National Coordinator for Health Information Technology (ONC) as special assistant to David Blumenthal when he was national coordinator for health information technology.  Jain worked with Blumenthal to implement the HITECH Provisions of the Recovery Act and to achieve broader alignment between health plans and federal meaningful use policies.  He was also tasked with devising strategies to enhance electronic health record usability and  organize private sector engagement efforts on behalf of ONC.

Jain was recruited by his college mentor Donald Berwick as a senior advisor to the administrator at the Centers for Medicare and Medicaid Services and was asked to help lead the launch of the Center for Medicare and Medicaid Innovation (CMMI) that was chartered by Section 3021 of the Patient Protection and Affordable Care Act.  He served briefly as its deputy director for policy and programs under Richard Gilfillan, the center's first director.  His optimistic perspective on the Center's capacity to reform payment for health care services  was met with skepticism from some critics.  Jain advocated within the administrator's office for speedier translation of health care delivery research into practice; an enhanced diabetes prevention benefit; and an expanded use of clinical registries.

Merck 
In 2012, Jain was appointed global Chief Medical Information and Innovation Officer of Merck.  At Merck, Jain built and led the company's digital health and big data group. The Merck Group launched 14 partnerships with industry and academic partners around the world including the Regenstrief Institute, Harvard University, PracticeFusion, and Israel's Maccabi. Notably, it led one of the most successful demonstrations of clinical decision support to enhance vaccine prescribing rates.

CareMore 
In 2015, Jain joined CareMore, an integrated health plan and delivery system that is headquartered in the Los Angeles suburb Cerritos.  CareMore was founded in 1993 and rose to national prominence for its model managing chronic disease and complex patients. Jain left CareMore after leading its growth from 4 to 12 states and leading its integration of Aspire Health and joined SCAN Group and Health Plan, a $3.4b independent managed care company as its President and CEO.

SCAN Group and Health Plan 
Jain joined SCAN, originally the Senior Care Action Network, in June 2020.  He immediately announced a focus on growth, diversification, innovation, and leadership in serving diverse and underserved populations.  In 2021, SCAN expanded operations to Arizona and Nevada.  In October 2021, SCAN announced that it had achieved its 5th consecutive 4.5 Star rating from the Centers for Medicare and Medicaid Services.  In 2021, SCAN announced the creation of new subsidiaries.  Welcome Health is a home-based geriatrics provider group.  Healthcare in Action serves homeless individuals through a street-based medicine model.  Jain maintains a faculty appointment as an adjunct professor at Stanford University School of Medicine and continues to see patients.

Writings 
Jain has authored more than 100 publications on health care delivery innovation and health care reform.  His article, "Practicing Medicine in the Age of Facebook," in the New England Journal of Medicine explores the interface between social media and the practice of clinical medicine.  He coined the term digital phenotype and described it in a paper in Nature Biotechnology with colleagues Brian Powers, Jared Hawkins, and John Brownstein.  Two of his articles in Journal of the American Medical Association, "Societal Perspectives on Physicians: Knights, Knaves, and Pawns?" (with Christine K. Cassel) and "Are Patients Knights, Knaves, and Pawn?" (with John Rother) build on the social theories of Julien LeGrand and apply them to physician and patient motivations. The book he co-edited with Susan Pories and Gordon Harper, "The Soul of a Doctor" has received mixed reviews.  His article, "The Racist Patient," was mentioned in the New York Times and generated controversy about the obligation of physicians to patients with racist attitudes towards them and critical comments directed at Jain's perspective.

Honors 
Jain is the subject of a Harvard Business School case study written by dean Nitin Nohria. Jain was selected to Boston Business Journal's 40 under 40 list.  He was named to Modern Healthcare’s lists of most influential minority health leaders, most influential clinical executives, and most influential leaders in healthcare.

References

External links 
 
Profile of Sachin Jain from Harvard Magazine
Profile from Harvard Medical School Annual Report
Harvard Business School Class of 2007 Profiles
Bio from World Healthcare Congress

1980 births
Living people
American academics of Indian descent
American health care chief executives
American physicians
American physicians of Indian descent
American Jains
Harvard Business School alumni
Harvard Medical School alumni
Harvard College alumni
Indian scholars